Peter McDermott may refer to:
 Peter McDermott (Gaelic footballer) (1918–2007), Gaelic footballer
 Peter McDermott (cricketer) (born 1996), English cricketer
 Peter McDermott (cyclist) (born 1944), Australian cyclist